The 2019 A-League Grand Final was the fourteenth A-League Grand Final, the championship-deciding match of the A-League in Australia and the culmination of the 2018–19 season. It was played on the 19 May 2019 at Optus Stadium in Perth between Perth Glory and Sydney FC, who finished the regular season first and second respectively. This was the first A-League grand final hosted in Perth and it is the highest attended grand final in A-League history.

Sydney participated in their fifth grand final, winning three of the previous four played prior to this match. Perth participated in their sixth grand final overall and second in the A-League era, winning two of the previous five.

The match ended 0–0 after extra time, with Sydney winning 4–1 on penalties to secure their fourth A-League title.

Teams
In the following table, finals until 2004 were in the National Soccer League era, since 2006 were in the A-League era.

Route to the final

The A-League Grand Final is the grand final for the A-League, a professional club soccer league that is based in Australia and New Zealand. The 2018–19 season was the fourteenth season in history and also the 42nd of top-flight football in Australia. Each team played against each other three times throughout the season for a total of twenty seven matches. After the regular season, the top six teams qualified to play in the finals with the teams placed between third and sixth playing in week one of the finals while the top two teams got an week off. This meant that playing in the first week was, Adelaide United, Melbourne City, Melbourne Victory and Wellington Phoenix while Perth Glory and Sydney FC having the bye for the first week.

The grand final will be contested by Perth Glory and Sydney FC which respectively finished one and two after the regular season with Perth finishing ahead of Sydney by eight points. During the regular season, the two teams played three times with Sydney leading the head-to-head at two wins to one.

Perth Glory

During the pre-season, they acquired former Socceroos Tomislav Mrcela from Korean club Jeonnam Dragons, Matthew Spiranovic from Chinese club Zhejiang Greentown and Jason Davidson from Croatian side HNK Rijeka in what became a trio in the backline. In the opening game of the season, they drew with Western Sydney Wanderers 1–1 at home with Andy Keogh scoring the first goal for Perth in the 2018–19 season. After gaining win in Round 2 and 3, Perth went to the top of the table after knocking off Adelaide United with two goals in the second half from Andy Keogh and Chris Ikonomidis securing the victory.

Sydney FC

Summary of results

Pre-match

Venue

The Grand Final was held at Optus Stadium in Perth, and was the second time that a major soccer match was held at the stadium, after the friendly between Perth Glory and Chelsea on 23 July 2018. The stadium is mainly used as an Australian rules football  ground for the West Coast Eagles and the Fremantle Dockers in the Australian Football League in the winter months, while in the summer it's used for cricket for the Perth Scorchers and occasionally the Australia national cricket team.

Ticket details
Ticket sales started on the Monday prior to the event. In the first few hours over 35,000 tickets had been sold, of which 20,000 were from club members. Two days later tickets went on sale to the general public.

Match

Summary
The match started at 4:45pm AWST in Perth with Shaun Evans, recipient of the A-League Referee of the Year, as the referee. The match was his first A-League Grand Final.

Details

Statistics

Broadcasting
The Grand Final was broadcast live throughout Australia on Fox Sports and Network Ten. The radio rights for the grand final was held by ABC with their grandstand coverage of the game.

See also
 2018–19 A-League
 List of A-League honours

References

External links
 Official A-League Website

2018–19 A-League season
A-League Men Grand Finals
A-League Grand Finals
A-League Grand Final 2019